Stone Jam is the fifth album by the American funk band Slave. It was released in 1980 on Cotillion Records and reissued in 1997 on Rhino Records. It was produced by Jimmy Douglass and Steve Washington. The album was listed on the Billboard 200, Billboard's 1981 Year-End Chart and was certified Gold by the RIAA. It contains the hit singles "Sizzlin' Hot", "Feel My Love", and "Watching You".

Overview
Slave's fifth album, Stone Jam, was their highest charting since their first, Slave, and their second to be certified Gold, Slave received the certification in 1977. The band's drummer, Steve Arrington, took on more singing responsibilities than on previous albums and this, combined with the vocals of Starleana Young, contributed to the album's success. The single "Watching You" entered the Billboard Hot 100 and also joined "Sizzlin' Hot" and "Feel My Love" on the R&B Singles Chart.

Reception and accolades
Alex Henderson of Allmusic breaks Slave's brand of funk into two categories; 'hardcore' and 'sophisticated'. He notes that their earlier work falls into the former category but, with the exception of the tracks "Stone Jam" and "Sizzlin' Hot", this album is in the later. He goes on to write that this "sleeker" approach is "every bit as appealing" as their earlier more aggressive work. He describes the tracks "Dreamin'", "Feel My Love" and "Let's Spend Some Time" as "addictive jams" and the album as "consistently melodic".

Jam-Master Jay of Run–D.M.C. has named it as one of his favorite albums. The album made the Billboard 1981 Year-End Pop Chart at number 99 and the Soul Chart at number 7.

The song "Watching You" was interpolated twice by rapper Snoop Dogg, first in the chorus of "Gin and Juice" in 1993, then in "Let's Get Blown" in 2004.

Tracks
"Let's Spend Some Time" (Mark Antone Adams/Jimmy Douglass/Mark Hicks/Jennifer Ivory/Curt Jones/Ray Turner/Steve Washington/Starleana Young) – 4:38
"Feel My Love"	(Adams/Steve Arrington/Hicks/Jones/Turner/Washington/Danny Webster) – 4:31
"Starting Over" (Adams/Hicks/Jones/Floyd Miller/Turner/Young) – 4:27
"Sizzlin' Hot"	(Adams/Arrington/Miller/Turner/Washington/Webster) – 5:07
"Watching You"	(Adams/Arrington/Turner/Washington/Webster) – 4:41
"Dreamin'" (Adams/Arrington/Jones/Miller/Turner/Washington) – 4:20
"Never Get Away" (Adams/Arrington/Hicks/Jones/Turner/Webster) – 5:09
"Stone Jam" (Adams/Hicks/Jones/Turner/Washington/Webster/Young) – 6:43

Bonus tracks
"Feel My Love" [Disco Mix] – 4:47
"Sizzlin' Hot" [Single Version] – 4:06
"Watching You" [Single Version] – 3:28

Personnel
Mark Antone Adams – assistant producer, bass guitar
Steve Arrington – drums, percussion, vocals
Charles Carter – assistant producer, saxophone
Bill-Dog Dooley – assistant engineer
Jimmy Douglass – arranger, engineer, mixing, producer, vocals
Bob Heimall – art direction, design
Mark Hicks – guitar
Bill Inglot – remastering
Jennifer Ivory – assistant executive producer
Curt Jones – guitar, vocals
Tom Lockett – assistant engineer, saxophone, vocals
Randy Mason – assistant engineer
David McLees – reissue producer
Floyd Miller – horn, percussion, trombone, vocals
Ray Turner – keyboards
Rickey Vincent – liner notes
Steve Washington – arranger, assistant engineer, executive producer, mixing, producer, trumpet, vocals
Danny Webster – guitar, vocals
Starleana Young – vocals

Charts and sales certification

Album charts

Single charts

RIAA certification

Release history

References 

1980 albums
Slave (band) albums
Rhino Records albums
Cotillion Records albums